Bambrick is a surname. Notable people with the surname include:

Gertrude Bambrick (1897–1974), American actress of the silent era
Joe Bambrick (1905–1983), Northern Irish international footballer who played for Chelsea, Walsall, Glentoran, and Linfield
Valentine Bambrick (1837–1864), recipient of the Victoria Cross for gallantry in the face of the enemy
Winifred Bambrick (1892–1969), Canadian classical musician and novelist